Bob Fox may refer to:

 Bob Fox (footballer) (born 1953), Australian rules footballer
 Bob Fox (musician) (born 1953), English folk guitarist and singer
 Bob Fox (architect) (born 1941), American architect

See also
 Robert Fox (disambiguation)